Polina Berezina Ksenofontova (born December 5, 1997) is a Russian-born Spanish individual rhythmic gymnast. She is a five-time (2017, 2018, 2020, 2021, 2022) all-around champion at the Spanish Rhythmic Gymnastic Championships.

Personal life 
She received her Spanish citizenship in 2014, enabling her to compete for the Spanish national team. Berezina studies Audiovisual Communication at the Universidad Católica San Antonio de Murcia in Murcia as of 2022. Her goal is to become a film director. She is fluent in Russian, Spanish, and English. She has one older sister who works in film and music in Moscow.

Career
Although she was born in Moscow, Russia, she had lived in Alicante since 2001. At the age of 7 she took up rhythmic gymnastics in Guardamar del Segura and, at the age of 8, entered a Rhythmic Gymnastics Club in Torrevieja (Alicante), where she trained under Mónica Ferrández until 2016. By 2008, her father's work led her to live again in Moscow and she began to combine her training sessions between Spain, with Mónica Ferrández, and Russia, with Oksana Skaldina.

Senior
She made her World Championships debut in 2015, at the age of 18. It was held in Stuttgart, Germany and she performed with Ribbon, finishing on 80th place in Qualifications. Together with Carolina Rodriguez, Sara Llana Garcia and Natalia Garcia she placed 10th in Team competition.

At the 2022 Rhythmic Gymnastics World Championships, she was part of the Spanish delegation that won the bronze medal in the team event, making the award Berezina’s first world team title at the World Championships.

References

External links 
 

Living people
1997 births
Spanish rhythmic gymnasts
Sportspeople from Valencia
Medalists at the Rhythmic Gymnastics World Championships